The following is a timeline of the history of the city of Rijeka, Croatia.

Prior to 19th century

 3rd century CE – Roman triumphal arch erected.
 799 CE – Town sacked by forces of Charlemagne (approximate date).
 1139 – "Counts of Duino" in power.
 1377 – Church of the Assumption founded.
 1453 – Virgin Mary pilgrimage church established near town.
 1471 – Austrians in power.
 1638 – St. Vitus Cathedral founded.
 1722 – Fiume becomes a free port.
 1779 – Town becomes part of the Kingdom of Hungary.
 1790 – Church of St. Nicholas built.

19th century
 1809 – Town occupied by French forces.
 1813 – Town taken by British forces.
 1822 – Town ceded to Hungary.
 1849 – Town becomes part of Croatia.
 1851 - Population: 10,568.
 1856 – Imperial Naval Academy founded.
 1870 – Town becomes part of the Kingdom of Hungary again.
 1872 – Drenova becomes part of Fiume.
 1873 – Railway begins operating.
 1875 – Whitehead's torpedo manufactory in operation.
 1877 – Port built.
 1890 - Population: 30,337.
 1891
 Fiume loses free port status.
 June: Austrian emperor visits town.
 1898 – October: Flood.
 1900 – Population: 38,955.

20th century

 1903
 Rijeka Synagogue built.
 Seamanship school founded.
 1906 – February: Labour strike.
 1913 – Stadio Comunale del Littorio opens.
 1919 – Town becomes part of the Italian Regency of Carnaro.
 1920 – Free State of Fiume established per Treaty of Rapallo.
 1921 – Communist Party of Fiume established.
 1922 – Town taken by Italian forces.
 1924
 16 March: Fiume becomes part of the Kingdom of Italy per Treaty of Rome.
 Town becomes capital of Fiume province.
 1925 - Catholic diocese of Rijeka established.
 1926 – Unione Sportiva Fiumana football club formed.
 1945 – Yugoslavs in power.
 1946 – NK Kvarner football club active.
 1947 – Fiume becomes part of Yugoslavia per treaty.
 1948 – Kvarnersko Brodogradilište shipyard active.
 1949 – City becomes seat of the Rijeka Oblast of Yugoslavia.
 1953 – Kvarnerska Rivijera football tournament begins.
 1961 - Population: 100,989.
 1970 – Rijeka Airport opens.
 1973
 University of Rijeka established.
 Dvorana Mladosti (sport venue) opens in Trsat.
 1978 – Automotodrom Grobnik opens.
 1991
 City becomes part of Croatia.
 Population: 167,964 city; metro 236,028.
 1993 - Slavko Linić becomes mayor.
 1998 – Polytechnic of Rijeka founded.
 2000
 Luka Rijeka company established.
 Vojko Obersnel becomes mayor.

21st century

 2011 – Population: 128,624; metro 213,666.
 2017 - Rijeka local elections, 2017 held.

See also
 History of Rijeka
 Other names of Rijeka
 List of governors and heads of state of Fiume
 List of mayors of Rijeka, 1948–present
 Timeline of Croatian history
 Timelines of other cities in Croatia:  Split, Zagreb

References

This article incorporates information from the Croatian Wikipedia, German Wikipedia, and Italian Wikipedia.

Bibliography

Published in 19th century

Published in 20th century

External links

 Europeana. Items related to Rijeka, various dates.

Years in Croatia
 
Rijeka
Rijeka